Cass County is a county located in the U.S. state of Illinois. As of the 2010 United States Census, the population was 13,642. Its county seat is Virginia. It is the home of the Jim Edgar Panther Creek State Fish and Wildlife Area.

History
Cass County was formed in 1837 out of Morgan County. It was named for Lewis Cass, a general in the War of 1812, Governor of the Michigan Territory, and United States Secretary of State in 1860. Cass was serving as Andrew Jackson's Secretary of War just before the County was named.

Geography

Adjacent counties

 Mason County - northeast
 Menard County - east
 Sangamon County - southeast
 Morgan County - south
 Brown County - west
 Schuyler County - northwest

National protected area
 Meredosia National Wildlife Refuge (part)

Rivers
 Illinois River
 Little Sangamon River
 Sangamon River

Major highways

  US Route 67
  Illinois Route 78
  Illinois Route 100
  Illinois Route 125

Climate and weather

Demographics

As of the 2010 United States Census, there were 13,642 people, 5,270 households, and 3,561 families residing in the county. The racial makeup of the county was 86.3% white, 3.1% black or African American, 0.3% Asian, 0.3% American Indian, 8.7% from other races, and 1.4% from two or more races. Those of Hispanic or Latino origin made up 16.8% of the population. In terms of ancestry, 22.6% were German, 21.0% were American, 10.6% were Irish, and 9.5% were English.

Of the 5,270 households, 33.9% had children under the age of 18 living with them, 51.1% were married couples living together, 10.9% had a female householder with no husband present, 32.4% were non-families, and 26.5% of all households were made up of individuals. The average household size was 2.55 and the average family size was 3.06. The median age was 38.7 years.

The median income for a household in the county was $41,544 and the median income for a family was $51,624. Males had a median income of $37,267 versus $26,634 for females. The per capita income for the county was $19,825. About 10.1% of families and 12.9% of the population were below the poverty line, including 14.2% of those under age 18 and 9.2% of those age 65 or over.

Politics
Typically for German-settled western Central Illinois, Cass County opposed the Civil War and became solidly Democratic for the next six decades. Only hatred of Woodrow Wilson’s policies towards Germany following World War I drove the county into Republican hands in the 1920 landslide. Between 1924 and 2008, the county was something of a bellwether, missing the national winner only in the very close 1960 election and the heavily drought- and farm crisis-influenced election of 1988. In the 2010s, the county has become reliably Republican in US presidential elections.
Cass County is located in Illinois's 18th Congressional District and is currently represented by Republican Darin LaHood. For the Illinois House of Representatives, the county is located in the 93rd district and is currently represented by Republican Norine Hammond. The county is located in the 47th district of the Illinois Senate, and is currently represented by Republican Jil Tracy.

Education

 A C Central Community Unit School District 262
 Beardstown Community Unit School District 15
 Virginia Community Unit School District 64

Communities

Cities
 Beardstown
 Virginia (seat)

Villages

 Arenzville
 Ashland
 Chandlerville

Unincorporated communities

 Anderson
 Bluff Springs
 Burlingame
 Clear Lake
 Hagener
 Jules
 Kisch
 Little Indian
 Newmansville
 Old Princeton
 Palmerton
 Philadelphia

Former communities
 Gurney
 Oak Grove (now part of Beardstown; not to be confused with community in Rock Island County)
 Sylvan

Townships

 Arenzville
 Ashland
 Beardstown
 Bluff Springs
 Chandlerville
 Hagener
 Newmansville
 Panther Creek
 Philadelphia
 Sangamon Valley
 Virginia

See also
 National Register of Historic Places listings in Cass County, Illinois

References

External links

 US Census Bureau 2007 TIGER/Line Shapefiles
 US Board on Geographic Names (GNIS)
 US National Atlas

 
Illinois counties
1837 establishments in Illinois
Populated places established in 1837